Silver Street was a street in London. It ran from the north end of Noble Street at Falcon Square to Wood Street. It originated in medieval times, and is one of the streets shown on a map known as the "Woodcut map of London" or the "Agas" map, which survives in a 17th-century version.

Its inhabitants included the Mountjoy family with whom William Shakespeare lodged at the beginning of the 17th century.
According to Charles Nicholl, who has written a detailed analysis of Shakespeare's life on Silver Street, their house can be identified on the "Woodcut map".The Mountjoys were Huguenots who ran a business making luxury headgear for ladies, including theatrical costumes.

During the Second World War the Cripplegate area, where the street was located, was virtually destroyed in the Blitz.

Legacy

A commemorative stone marks the site of St Olave's Church, Silver Street, which was destroyed in the Great Fire of London.

On 21 April 2016, the City of London installed a blue plaque in Noble Street, near the site of the Mountjoys' house.
The plaque reads "William Shakespeare had lodgings near here in 1604, at the house of Christopher and Mary Mountjoy".

References

Streets in the City of London